A Private Matter is a 1992 American made-for-television drama film based on the true 1962 story of Sherri Finkbine, a resident of Phoenix, Arizona in the first trimester of her fifth pregnancy. She was the popular hostess of the locally produced children's television show Romper Room.

She was taking the drug thalidomide—a drug that was, at one time, commonly given to pregnant women in order to alleviate morning sickness and other uncomfortable symptoms associated with pregnancy.  In the early 1960s, it became known that the use of thalidomide while pregnant caused significant deformities to the fetus. Sherri expressed concerns about the well-being of her own baby, and consulted with her physician who scheduled a legal, therapeutic abortion at the Good Samaritan Hospital in Phoenix.

Abortion was illegal in Arizona in the 1960s, but exceptions were made if the mother’s life was at risk, and under this exception, abortions were performed in hospitals regularly. The Finkbines scheduled an abortion, but when Sherri’s story was picked up by the media it created a media firestorm. An acquaintance who worked for the Arizona Republic had asked Sherri, on a promise of anonymity, to share her story. Sherri agreed, hoping that by doing so she could warn other women about the dangers of thalidomide. Her identity was exposed, however, and her private decision was soon subjected to public scrutiny. The film shows the harassment the family went through as they went through various appeals as they sought to obtain abortion services.

The hospital refused the use of their facilities for an abortion so Finkbine filed a lawsuit to compel the use of Good Samaritan Hospital. A public and bitter struggle ensued, culminating with Finkbine terminating her pregnancy in Sweden.

The movie premiered on HBO on June 20, 1992.  It was noted at the time of the movie's release that U.S. network television had shied away from stories dealing with abortion.

Plot

Cast
 Sissy Spacek as Sherri Finkbine
 Aidan Quinn as Bob Finkbine
 Estelle Parsons as Mary Chessen
 Sheila McCarthy as Diane Callaghan
 Leon Russom as Steve Morris
 Xander Berkeley as Peter Zenner
 Jeff Perry as Randall Everett
 Steven Gilborn as Harvey

References

External links 
 

1992 television films
1992 films
1992 drama films
HBO Films films
Films about abortion
Films directed by Joan Micklin Silver
Films scored by James Newton Howard
American drama television films
1990s American films